Stanway Pegasus Football Club is a football club based in Stanway, England. They are currently members of the Eastern Counties League Division One South and play at Stanway School, Stanway.

History
Formed in 2018, Stanway Pegasus trace their roots back to the 1970s from Colchester-based Sunday league side AFC Pegasus. Upon formation, Stanway Pegasus entered the Essex and Suffolk Border League Division Two. In 2022, after winning the Essex & Suffolk Border League, the club was admitted into the Eastern Counties League Division One South.

Ground
The club currently play at Stanway School, Stanway.

References

Association football clubs established in 2018
2018 establishments in England
Football clubs in England
Football clubs in Essex
Essex and Suffolk Border Football League
Eastern Counties Football League